Thomas Clinch (26 July 1874 – 1956) was an English footballer who played in the Football League for Notts County and Sheffield United.

References

1874 births
1956 deaths
English footballers
Association football defenders
English Football League players
Chorley F.C. players
Nelson F.C. players
Halliwell F.C. players
Sheffield United F.C. players
Reading F.C. players
Notts County F.C. players